Triphysaria floribunda is a rare species of flowering plant in the family Orobanchaceae known by the common name San Francisco owl's-clover. It is endemic to California, where it is known only from the San Francisco Bay Area. It is limited to coastal regions of Marin, San Francisco, and San Mateo Counties, where it occurs in coastal prairie habitats, sometimes on serpentine soils.

Description
Triphysaria floribunda is an annual herb producing a hairy to hairless yellow-brown stem up to about 30 centimeters in maximum height. Like many species in its family it is a facultative root parasite on other plants, attaching to their roots via haustoria to tap nutrients. Its greenish leaves are up to 4 centimeters long and are divided into several narrow, pointed lobes.

The inflorescence is a spike of flowers a few centimeters in length. Each flower has a narrow greenish upper lip and a wide lower lip which is divided into yellowish or white pouches.

References

External links
Jepson Manual Treatment: Triphysaria floribunda (San Francisco owl's clover)
The Nature Conservancy
U.C. Photos gallery: Triphysaria floribunda

Orobanchaceae
Endemic flora of California
Endemic flora of the San Francisco Bay Area
Natural history of the California chaparral and woodlands
Threatened flora of California